Malta competed at the 1988 Summer Olympics in Seoul, South Korea.

Competitors
The following is the list of number of competitors in the Games.

Results by event

Archery
Women's Individual Competition
 Joanna Agius 
 Preliminary Round — did not advance (→ 58th place)

Judo
Men's Competition
 Jason Trevisan

Sailing
Men's Board Sailing
 Jean Paul Fleri Soler

Wrestling
Men's Competition
 Paul Farrugia
 Jesmond Giordemaina

References

Official Olympic Reports

Nations at the 1988 Summer Olympics
1988
Summer Olympics